Mary Anna Hamilton, Duchess of Abercorn (née Lady Mary Curzon-Howe; 23 July 1848 – 10 May 1929), was an English aristocrat. She was the daughter of Richard Curzon-Howe, 1st Earl Howe, and his second wife, Anne Gore.

Life
The Duchess held the office of Lady-in-Waiting to Queen Alexandra.

Marriage and issue
She married James Hamilton, Marquess of Hamilton, eldest son of James Hamilton, 1st Duke of Abercorn and Lady Louisa Jane Russel on 7 January 1869 at St. George's Church, St. George Street, Hanover Square, London, England.

They had seven sons and two daughters:
 James Albert Edward Hamilton, 3rd Duke of Abercorn (1869–1953)
 Lord Claud Penn Alexander Hamilton (1871–1871, on the same day)
 Lord Charlie Hamilton (1874–1874, on the same day)
 Lady Alexandra Phyllis Hamilton (1876–1918), who had The Princess of Wales as sponsor at her baptism, she was lost at sea aboard RMS Leinster, unmarried.
 Lord Claud Francis Hamilton (1878–1878, on the same day)
 Lady Gladys Mary Hamilton (1880–1917), who in 1902 married Ralph Francis Forward-Howard, 7th Earl of Wicklow (1877–1946) She was his first wife; and they had one son.
 Lord Arthur John Hamilton (1883–1914), who was Deputy Master of the Household from 1913, Captain in the Irish Guards and was killed in action at the First Battle of Ypres.
 Lord unnamed Hamilton (1886–1886, on the same day)
 Lord Claud Nigel Hamilton (1889–1975), Captain in the Grenadier Guards, fought in the First World War and served in the household of King George V, his widow and Queen Elizabeth II as Deputy Master of the Household, as Extra Equerry, as Equerry in Ordinary and as Comptroller, Treasurer and Extra Equerry. In 1933 he married Violet Ruby Ashton. They had no issue.

Ancestry

References

1848 births
1929 deaths
Daughters of British earls
British duchesses by marriage
Mary
Mary
Mary
British ladies-in-waiting